Interstate system may refer to:

A system for international relations
Interstate Highway System, a network of controlled-access highways in the United States
Interstate system (world-systems theory), a specific theory of state relationships within world-systems theory.